Bur Gaban, Buur gaaban  is a coastal town in the northeastern Bari region of Somalia.

Demographics 
Bur gaban have significant population hail Dishiishe, Darod.

References

External links

Bur Gaban

Populated places in Bari, Somalia